Jose Maria Morte Veloso (April 30, 1886 – April 13, 1969) was a Filipino lawyer, politician and legislator. Son of Isidro Veloso and Casiana Morte and educated at Cebu's Seminary College in 1903, he proceeded to take up law at the University of Santo Tomas, became a lawyer in 1909 in the same year he graduated from the university, and in the next year, established a law firm called Veloso and Singson.

From 1912 to 1922, he was the governor of the province of Leyte, although he relinquished the position on his second term to serve as senator from the 9th district from 1916 to 1919. He was also elected as representative of Leyte's 3rd district from 1922 to 1925 and the 5th district from 1935 to 1938 as an assemblyman and from 1945 to 1946 as a post-Commonwealth representative. He was also elected senator from the country's 9th district from 1916 to 1919 and from 1925 to 1935.

His family later on became one of the oldest political dynasties in the country and oldest in Leyte, pre-dating that of the Romualdezes whose descendants include Imelda Marcos.

References 

1886 births
1969 deaths
20th-century Filipino lawyers
Nacionalista Party politicians
KALIBAPI politicians
Senators of the 4th Philippine Legislature
Senators of the 5th Philippine Legislature
Members of the House of Representatives of the Philippines from Leyte (province)
Members of the National Assembly of the Philippines
Members of the National Assembly (Second Philippine Republic)
Members of the Philippine Legislature
Governors of Leyte (province)
University of Santo Tomas alumni
University of San Carlos alumni